Allahabad–Mau–Gorakhpur main line is a passenger and freight train line operating in the Uttar Pradesh state of India.

Operation
The Allahabad–Mau–Gorakhpur mainline is owned by Indian Railways, and operated by North Eastern Railway and North Central Railway respectively.

Technical information 
Using  broad gauge track, the rolling stock on the line includes the diesel locomotives; WDM-2, WDM-3A, WDP 4 and WDG 4. The main line is now electrified. There is a max operating speed of up to 110 km/h.

References 

5 ft 6 in gauge railways in India

Railway lines in Uttar Pradesh
Railway lines opened in 1930

Transport in Allahabad district
Transport in Gorakhpur district
Mau district